Paronychia macrosepala is a species of plant in the family Caryophyllaceae (carpetweeds).

Sources

References 

macrosepala